French colonial architecture includes several styles of architecture used by the French during colonization. Many former French colonies, especially those in Southeast Asia, have previously been reluctant to promote their colonial architecture as an asset for tourism; however, in recent times, the new generation of local authorities has somewhat "embraced" the architecture and has begun to advertise it. French Colonial architecture has a long history, beginning in North America in 1604 and being most active in the Western Hemisphere (Caribbean, Guiana, Canada, Louisiana) until the 19th century, when the French turned their attention more to Africa, Asia, and the Pacific.

In Canada
French settlements in Canada date back to the mid-16th century until the French defeat in Seven Years' War where New France was annexed by the British Crown in 1763 as a result of the Treaty of Paris. The settlements in the regions were extensive, hence the abundant architectural legacy from that period shows itself particularly in Quebec City but also in the city of Montreal, which has a significant Canadien population. Most buildings constructed during the French colonial period utilized a heavy timber frame of logs installed vertically on a sill, poteaux-sur-sol, or into the earth, poteaux-en-terre.  An infill of lime mortar or clay mixed with small stones (pierrotage) or a mixture of mud, moss, and animal hair (bousillage) was used to pack between the logs.  Many times the infill would later be replaced with brick.  This method of construction was used in the Illinois Country as well as Louisiana. General characteristics of a French Colonial dwelling included a raised basement which would support the floor of the home's primary living quarters.  Exterior stairs were another common element; the stairs would often climb up to a distinctive, full-length veranda or "gallery," on a home's façade. The roof over the veranda was normally part of the overall roof. French Colonial roofs were either a steep hipped roof, with a dormer or dormers, or a side-gabled roof.  The veranda or gallery was often accessed via French doors.  French Colonial homes in the American South commonly had stuccoed exterior walls.

In the United States
French Colonial was one of four domestic architectural styles that developed during the colonial period in what would become the United States. The other styles were Colonial Georgian, Dutch Colonial, and Spanish Colonial.  French Colonial developed in the settlements of the Illinois Country and French Louisiana.  It is believed to have been primarily influenced by the building styles of French Canada and the Caribbean. It had its beginnings in 1699 with the establishment of French Louisiana but continued to be built after Spain assumed control of the colonial territory in 1763. Styles of building that evolved during the French colonial period include the Creole cottage, Creole townhouse, and French Creole plantation house.

In Southeast Asia

French colonisation of three countries in mainland Southeast Asia—Vietnam, Laos, and Cambodia, known as Indochina in the 19th and 20th centuries, left a lasting architectural legacy. Most French colonial buildings, now mostly transformed for public use, are located in large urban areas, namely Hanoi and Ho Chi Minh City (Vietnam), and Phnom Penh (Cambodia).

Vietnam 
Various colonial buildings and constructions have become popular tourist destinations. Major landmarks that have become icons of cities including Hanoi and Ho Chi Minh City include:

Cambodia 
 In Phnom Penh:
Central Market
Royal Railway Station
Hotel Le Royal
National Library of Cambodia
Villa Picturesque
Unesco Sino-Khmer Villa

Laos

In Africa

North Africa
19th and early 20th-century French colonial architecture is typical of the European districts of most Algerian and Tunisian cities, as well as Casablanca, Morocco. In the mid-20th-century, Algiers became an important center for Modernist architecture.

West Africa
French colonial architecture is found in many large and mid-sized West African cities, with a particularly significant concentration in the former capital city, Saint-Louis, Senegal.

Central Africa
Brazzaville, the capital of Congo, and Douala, the largest city of Cameroon have many French colonial buildings.

See also

American colonial architecture, which states that by 1770 the briquette-entre-poteaux replaced earlier types of French Colonial construction.
Creole cottage
Hotel St. Pierre
Lafitte's Blacksmith Shop

References

 
Colonial architecture in the United States
New France